Alexander Arkadyevich Suvorov, Prince Italsky, Count Rymniksky (13 June 1804, Saint Petersburg – 12 February 1882, Saint Petersburg), was a Russian general, diplomat and politician.

Life

Education
His parents were Arkadi Suvorov and his wife Elena Aleksandrovna Naryshkina, making him the grandson of Alexander Suvorov. His father was drowned in 1811 when Alexander was still a child. He was then sent to the Jesuit college in Saint Petersburg, where he was raised (as was then the fashion) alongside other sons of Russian aristocrats. Three years later, due to a change in his attitude towards the Jesuits, his uncle Cyril A. Naryshkin (who had himself been taught by the Jesuits) withdrew Alexander from the school and educated him himself, inviting the best teachers. Alexander's mother Elena was then living in Florence and wanted him beside her, so he moved to Italy, where (aged 13) he was placed in a school run by the famous Swiss educator Fellenberg in Gofvil near Bern. Alexander stayed here for five years, perfectly mastering several foreign languages, as well as studying history and natural sciences.

Aged 18 he left for Paris, studying at the Sorbonne, before moving on to the University of Göttingen. The long time he spent abroad as a young man undoubtedly influenced his worldview and made him familiar with intellectual movements in Western Europe - for example, while studying in Göttingen, in 1825 he joined the student associated Corps Curonia Goettingensis or Kuron VII Göttingen.

Career

He fought in the Caucasus and in Poland and was repeatedly sent on diplomatic missions to the German courts. In 1848 he became Governor-General of the Baltic provinces, which he managed highly successfully. From 1861 he was governor general of Saint Petersburg and from 1866 inspector general of the infantry. He is buried in the cemetery of the Trinity-Sergius Monastery. He was awarded Serbian Order of the Cross of Takovo and a number of other decorations.

Family
In 1830 he married Lyubov V Yartsova, and their children were:
Lyubov (1831—1883), first married to state councilor, Gentleman of the Bedchamber AV Golitsyn, second married to Colonel Vladimir Molostvovym (1835–1877), son of Lieutenant General and Senator Vladimir Porfirevich Molostvova .
Arkady (1834–1893), aide-de-camp to Alexander II of Russia, who died childless, causing the princes of Italy, Counts of Suvorov-Rymniksky line to become extinct.
Alexandra (1844–1927), maid of honour, married Major-General Sergei Kozlov (1853–1906).

References

1804 births
1882 deaths
Military personnel from Saint Petersburg
People from Sankt-Peterburgsky Uyezd
Alexander Arkadyevich
Russian princes
Italian princes
Counts of the Holy Roman Empire
Diplomats of the Russian Empire
Politicians of the Russian Empire
Imperial Russian Army generals
19th-century people from the Russian Empire
19th-century diplomats
University of Paris alumni
University of Göttingen alumni
Recipients of the Order of the Cross of Takovo
Diplomats from Saint Petersburg